Nicola Velotti (born 11 November 1964) is an Italian psychoanalyst, professor, art therapist and philosophical consultant.

Early life and education 
Velotti was born in Casamarciano, Italy.

In 1990 he graduated in Philosophy - psycho-pedagogical address - at the University of the Studies "Federico II" of Naples with a thesis in Differential Psychology entitled: The enigma of art: Freudian psychoanalytic paths and the poetics of Pier Paolo Pasolini.

In 1994 he specialized in Analytical Psychotherapy and AutogenicTraining at the Institute of Scientific Research A.R.P.A.D. (Psychology Research Association Applied and Dynamic) in Rome and in Art Therapy at the C.I.S.A.T. (Italian Center Art Therapy Studies) of Naples.

Career 

In 1991 he published the Italian Manifesto of Art Therapy with the publishing house Flaccovio Editore, with the collaboration of artists including painter and sculptor Camillo Capolongo. In the following years, Velotti proposed and conducted art therapy workshops with the collaboration of the artist Claudio Costa and the psychiatrist Antonio Slavich in the former Psichatrico Hospital of the Quarto Costa in Genoa. In the former Psychiatric Hospital of Aversa with the collaboration of the psychiatrist Sergio Piro he has re-proposed and conducted art therapy workshops.

In 1994, after having participated in the first International Conference on Philosophical Consultancy in Vancouver organized by Ran Lahav and Lou Marinoff, he published the Italian Manifesto of Philosophical Practice at the Flaccovio publishing house, supported by philosophers such as Gerardo Marotta founder of the Italian Institute of Studies Philosophical. In the following years he followed the courses held by Gerd Achenbach at the University of Cologne, the founder of philosophical counseling. He contributed with his initiatives to the spread of art therapy and philosophical counseling in nursing homes for the elderly, in centers for minors at risk and in facilities for the disabled.

In 1999, he became a professional art therapist for the American Art Therapy Association and attended courses taught by Edith Kramer of New York University. In 2000 he founded the "Philosophic Therapy Center" association and started a first training course in philosophical counseling and art therapy. He teaches Principles and Techniques of Artistic Therapy and History of Cinematography and Audiovisual at the ABAN Academy of Fine Arts in Nola (Italy). He is a member of the scientific committee of the Association des Psychanalystes Européens (EPA) and has collaborated with several scientific journals.

Research work
His research is fundamentally concerned with the practical application of art and philosophy which must help promote the state of psycho-physical well-being, help overcome stereotypes and prejudices, promote the recovery of the ability to interact positively with others and with the environment, make others appreciate the diversity and accept their own.

Publications 
Il Manifesto Italiano dell’Arteterapia, Flaccovio Editore, Palerme, (1991)
 Il Manifesto Italiano della Pratica Filosofica, Flaccovio Editore, (1994)
 Nicola Velotti 2018 L’ arte secondo la psicoanalisi: le basi teoriche dell’arteterapia 
 Nicola Velotti 2019 Pier Paolo Pasolini: l’ arte poetica e filmica come terapia

References 

1964 births
Living people
Italian philosophers
Italian psychoanalysts
Art therapists